Chingravthi is a village in the Bulandshahr district of Uttar Pradesh, India.

Villages in Bulandshahr district